Paul Nolan may refer to:
 Paul Alexander Nolan, Canadian actor
 Paul V. Nolan, member of the Tennessee House of Representatives